The psychological and physiological effects of meditation have been studied. In recent years, studies of meditation have increasingly involved the use of modern instruments, such as fMRI and EEG, which are able to observe brain physiology and neural activity in living subjects, either during the act of meditation itself or before and after meditation. Correlations can thus be established between meditative practices and brain structure or function.

Since the 1950s hundreds of studies on meditation have been conducted, but many of the early studies were flawed and thus yielded unreliable results. Contemporary studies have attempted to address many of these flaws with the hope of guiding current research into a more fruitful path. In 2013, researchers found moderate evidence that meditation can reduce anxiety, depression, and pain, but no evidence that it is more effective than active treatments such as drugs or exercise. Another major review article also cautioned about possible misinformation and misinterpretation of data related to the subject.

Effects of mindfulness meditation

A previous study commissioned by the US Agency for Healthcare Research and Quality found that meditation interventions reduce multiple negative dimensions of psychological stress. Other systematic reviews and meta-analyses show that mindfulness meditation has several mental health benefits such as bringing about reductions in depression symptoms, improvements in mood, stress-resilience and attentional control. Mindfulness interventions also appear to be a promising intervention for managing depression in youth.
Mindfulness meditation is useful for managing stress, anxiety and also appears to be effective in treating substance use disorders.
A recent meta analysis by Hilton et al. (2016) including 30 randomized controlled trials found high quality evidence for improvement in depressive symptoms.
Other review studies have shown that mindfulness meditation can enhance the psychological functioning of breast cancer survivors, is effective for people with eating disorders and may also be effective in treating psychosis.

Studies have also shown that rumination and worry contribute to mental illnesses such as depression and anxiety, and mindfulness-based interventions are effective in the reduction of worry.

Some studies suggest that mindfulness meditation contributes to a more coherent and healthy sense of self and identity, when considering aspects such as sense of responsibility, authenticity, compassion, self-acceptance and character.

Brain mechanisms

The analgesic effect of mindfulness meditation may involve multiple brain mechanisms, but there are too few studies to allow conclusions about its effects on chronic pain.

Changes in the brain

Mindfulness meditation is under study for whether structural changes in the brain may occur, but most studies have weak methodology. A meta-analysis found preliminary evidence for effects in the prefrontal cortex and other brain regions associated with body awareness. However, the results should be interpreted with caution because funnel plots indicate that publication bias is an issue in meditation research. A 2016 review using 78 functional neuroimaging studies suggests that different meditation styles are associated with different brain activity.

Attention and mindfulness

Attention networks and mindfulness meditation
Psychological and Buddhist conceptualizations of mindfulness both highlight awareness and attention training as key components, in which levels of mindfulness can be cultivated with practise of mindfulness meditation. Focused attention meditation (FAM) and open monitoring meditation (OMM) are distinct types of mindfulness meditation; FAM refers to the practice of intently maintaining focus on one object, whereas OMM is the progression of general awareness of one's surroundings while regulating thoughts.

Focused attention meditation is typically practiced first to increase the ability to enhance attentional stability, and awareness of mental states with the goal being to transition to open monitoring meditation practise that emphasizes the ability to monitor moment-by-moment changes in experience, without a focus of attention to maintain. Mindfulness meditation may lead to greater cognitive flexibility.

In an active randomized controlled study completed in 2019, participants who practiced mindfulness meditation demonstrated a greater improvement in awareness and attention than participants in the active control condition. Alpha wave neural oscillation power (which is normally associated with an alert resting state) has been shown to be increased by mindfulness in both healthy subjects and patients.

Sustained attention
Tasks of sustained attention relate to vigilance and the preparedness that aids completing a particular task goal. Psychological research into the relationship between mindfulness meditation and the sustained attention network have revealed the following:
 In a continuous performance task an association was found between higher dispositional mindfulness and more stable maintenance of sustained attention.
 In an EEG study, the attentional blink effect was reduced, and P3b ERP amplitude decreased in a group of participants who completed a mindfulness retreat. The incidence of reduced attentional blink effect relates to an increase in detectability of a second target.
 A greater degree of attentional resources may also be reflected in faster response times in task performance, as was found for participants with higher levels of mindfulness experience.

Selective attention
 Selective attention as linked with the orientation network, is involved in selecting the relevant stimuli to attend to.
 Performance in the ability to limit attention to potentially sensory inputs (i.e. selective attention) was found to be higher following the completion of an eight-week MBSR course, compared to a one-month retreat and control group (with no mindfulness training). The ANT task is a general applicable task designed to test the three attention networks, in which participants are required to determine the direction of a central arrow on a computer screen. Efficiency in orienting that represent the capacity to selectively attend to stimuli was calculated by examining changes in the reaction time that accompanied cues indicating where the target occurred relative to the aid of no cues.
 Meditation experience was found to correlate negatively with reaction times on an Eriksen flanker task measuring responses to global and local figures. Similar findings have been observed for correlations between mindfulness experience in an orienting score of response times taken from Attention Network Task performance.
 Participants who engaged in the Meditation Breath Attention Score exercise performed better on anagram tasks and reported greater focused attention on this task compared to those who did not undergo this exercise.

Executive control attention
 Executive control attention include functions of inhibiting the conscious processing of distracting information. In the context of mindful meditation, distracting information relates to attention grabbing mental events such as thoughts related to the future or past.
 More than one study have reported findings of a reduced Stroop effect following mindfulness meditation training. The Stroop effect indexes interference created by having words printed in colour that differ to the read semantic meaning e.g. green printed in red. However findings for this task are not consistently found. For instance the MBSR may differ to how mindful one becomes relative to a person who is already high in trait mindfulness.
 Using the Attention Network Task (a version of Eriksen flanker task) it was found that error scores that indicate executive control performance were reduced in experienced meditators  and following a brief five-session mindfulness training program.
 A neuroimaging study supports behavioural research findings that higher levels of mindfulness are associated with greater proficiency to inhibit distracting information. As greater activation of the rostral anterior cingulate cortex (ACC) was shown for mindfulness meditators than matched controls.
 Participants with at least 6 years of experience meditating performed better on the Stroop Test compared to participants who had not had experience meditating. The group of meditators also had lower reaction times during this test than the group of non-meditators.
 Following a Stroop test, reduced amplitude of the P3 ERP component was found for a meditation group relative to control participants. This was taken to signify that mindfulness meditation improves executive control functions of attention. An increased amplitude in the N2 ERP component was also observed in the mindfulness meditation group, thought to reflect more efficient perceptual discrimination in earlier stages of perceptual processing.

Emotion regulation and mindfulness 

Research shows meditation practices lead to greater emotional regulation abilities. Mindfulness can help people become more aware of thoughts in the present moment, and this increased self-awareness leads to better processing and control over one's responses to surroundings or circumstances.

Positive effects of this heightened awareness include a greater sense of empathy for others, an increase in positive patterns of thinking, and a reduction in anxiety. Reductions in rumination also have been found following mindfulness meditation practice, contributing to the development of positive thinking and emotional well-being.

Evidence of mindfulness and emotion regulation outcomes
Emotional reactivity can be measured and reflected in brain regions related to the production of emotions. It can also be reflected in tests of attentional performance, indexed in poorer performance in attention related tasks. The regulation of emotional reactivity as initiated by attentional control capacities can be taxing to performance, as attentional resources are limited.
 Patients with social anxiety disorder (SAD) exhibited reduced amygdala activation in response to negative self-beliefs following an MBSR intervention program that involves mindfulness meditation practice.
 The LPP ERP component indexes arousal and is larger in amplitude for emotionally salient stimuli relative to neutral. Individuals higher in trait mindfulness showed lower LPP responses to high arousal unpleasant images. These findings suggest that individuals with higher trait mindfulness were better able to regulate emotional reactivity to emotionally evocative stimuli.
 Participants who completed a seven-week mindfulness training program demonstrated a reduction in a measure of emotional interference (measured as slower responses times following the presentation of emotional relative to neutral pictures). This suggests a reduction in emotional interference.
 Following a MBSR intervention, decreases in social anxiety symptom severity were found, as well as increases in bilateral parietal cortex neural correlates. This is thought to reflect the increased employment of inhibitory attentional control capacities to regulate emotions.
 Participants who engaged in emotion-focus meditation and breathing meditation exhibited delayed emotional response to negatively valanced film stimuli compared to participants who did not engage in any type of meditation.

Controversies in mindful emotion regulation
It is debated as to whether top-down executive control regions such as the dorsolateral prefrontal cortex (DLPFC), are required or not to inhibit reactivity of the amygdala activation related to the production of evoked emotional responses. Arguably an initial increase in activation of executive control regions developed during mindfulness training may lessen with increasing mindfulness expertise.

Stress reduction
Research has shown stress reduction benefits from mindfulness. A 2019 study tested the effects of meditation on the psychological well-being, work stress, and blood pressure of employees working in the United Kingdom. One group of participants were instructed to meditate once a day using a mindfulness app on their smartphones, while the control group did not engage in meditation. Measurements of well-being, stress, and perceived workplace support were taken for both groups before the intervention and then again after four months. Based on self-report questionnaires, the participants who engaged in meditation showed a significant increase in psychological well-being and perceived workplace support. The meditators also reported a significant decrease in anxiety and stress levels.

Another study conducted to understand association between mindfulness, perceived stress and work engagement indicated that mindfulness was associated with lower perceived stress and higher work engagement.

Other research shows decreased stress levels in people who engage in meditation after shorter periods of time as well. Evidence of significant stress reduction was found after only three weeks of meditation intervention. Brief, daily meditation sessions can alter one's behavioral response to stressors, improving coping mechanisms and decreasing the adverse impact caused by stress. A study from 2016 examined anxiety and emotional states of naive meditators before and after a seven-day meditation retreat in Thailand. Results displayed a significant reduction in perceived stress after this traditional Buddhist meditation retreat.

Insomnia and sleep
Chronic insomnia is often associated with anxious hyperarousal and frustration over inability to sleep. Mindfulness has been shown to reduce insomnia and improve sleep quality, although self-reported measures show larger effects than objective measures.

Future directions
A large part of mindfulness research is dependent on technology. As new technology continues to be developed, new imaging techniques will become useful in this field. Real-time fMRI might give immediate feedback and guide participants through the programs. It could also be used to more easily train and evaluate mental states during meditation itself.

Effects of other types of meditation

Insight (Vipassana) meditation

Vipassana meditation is a component of Buddhist practice. Phra Taweepong Inwongsakul and Sampath Kumar from the University of Mysore have been studying the effects of this meditation on 120 students by measuring the associated increase of cortical thickness in the brain. The results of this study are inconclusive. Vipassana meditation leads to more than just mindfulness, but has been found to reduce stress, increase well-being and self-kindness. These effects were found to be most powerful short-term, but still had a relatively significant impact six months later. In a study conducted by Szekeres and Wertheim (2014), they found stress to be the category that seemed to have the most regression, but the others contained higher prevalence when compared to the participants' original scores that were given before embarking on Vipassana meditation. Overall, according to self-reports, Vipassana can have short and long-term effects on an individual.

EEG studies on Vipassana meditators seemed to indicate significant increase in parieto-occipital gamma rhythms in experienced meditators (35–45 Hz).
In another study conducted by NIMHANS on Vipassana meditators, researchers found readings associated with improved cognitive processing after a session of meditation, with distinct and graded difference in the readings between novice meditators and experienced meditators.

An essential component to the Vipassana mediation approach is the focus on awareness, referring to bodily sensations and psychological status. In a study conducted by Zeng et al. (2013), awareness was described as the acknowledgement of consciousness which is monitoring all aspects of the environment. This definition differentiates the concept of awareness from mindfulness. The emphasis on awareness, and the way it assists in monitoring emotion, is unique to this meditative practice.

Kundalini yoga
Kundalini yoga has proved to increase the prevention of cognitive decline and evaluate the response of biomarkers to treatment, thereby shedding light on the underlying mechanisms of the link between Kundalini Yoga and cognitive impairment. For the study, 81 participants aged 55 and older who had subjective memory complaints and met criteria for mild cognitive impairment, indicated by a total score of 0.5 on the Clinical Dementia Rating Scale. The results showed that at 12 weeks, both the yoga group showed significant improvements in recall memory and visual memory and showed a significant sustained improvement in memory up to the 24-week follow-up, the yoga group showed significant improvement in verbal fluency and sustained significant improvements in executive functioning at week 24. In addition, the yoga cohort showed significant improvement in depressive symptoms, apathy, and resilience from emotional stress. This research was provided by Helen Lavretsky, M.D. and colleagues. In another study, Kundalini Yoga did not show significant effectiveness in treating obsessive-compulsive disorders compared with Relaxation/Meditation.

Sahaja yoga and mental silence
Sahaja yoga meditation is regarded as a mental silence meditation, and has been shown to correlate with particular brain and brain wave characteristics. One study has led to suggestions that Sahaja meditation involves 'switching off' irrelevant brain networks for the maintenance of focused internalized attention and inhibition of inappropriate information. Sahaja meditators appear to benefit from lower depression and scored above control group for emotional well-being and mental health measures on SF-36 ratings.

A study comparing practitioners of Sahaja Yoga meditation with a group of non-meditators doing a simple relaxation exercise, measured a drop in skin temperature in the meditators compared to a rise in skin temperature in the non-meditators as they relaxed. The researchers noted that all other meditation studies that have observed skin temperature have recorded increases and none have recorded a decrease in skin temperature. This suggests that Sahaja Yoga meditation, being a mental silence approach, may differ both experientially and physiologically from simple relaxation.

Transcendental Meditation

The first Transcendental Meditation (TM) research studies were conducted at UCLA and Harvard University and published in Science and the American Journal of Physiology in 1970 and 1971. However, much research has been of poor quality, including a high risk for bias due to the connection of researchers to the TM organization and the selection of subjects with a favorable opinion of TM. Independent systematic reviews have not found health benefits for TM exceeding those of relaxation and health education. A 2013 statement from the American Heart Association described the evidence supporting TM as a treatment for hypertension as Level IIB, meaning that TM "may be considered in clinical practice" but that its effectiveness is "unknown/unclear/uncertain or not well-established".

In another study, TM proved comparable with other kinds of relaxation therapies in reducing anxiety. Practitioners of TM have demonstrated a one Hertz reduction in EEG alpha wave frequency relative to controls.

Research on unspecified or multiple types of meditation

Brain activity

The medial prefrontal and posterior cingulate cortices have been found to be relatively deactivated during meditation by experienced meditators using concentration, lovingkindness and choiceless awareness meditation. In addition experienced meditators were found to have stronger coupling between the posterior cingulate, dorsal anterior cingulate, and dorsolateral prefrontal cortices both when meditating and when not meditating. Over time meditation can actually increase the integrity of both gray and white matter. The added amount of gray matter found in the brain stem after meditation improves communication between the cortex and all other areas within the brain. Meditation often stimulates a large network of cortical regions including the frontal and parietal regions, lateral occipital lobe, the insular cortex, thalamic nuclei, basal ganglia, and the cerebellum region in the brain. These parts of the brain are connected with attention and the default network of the brain which is associated to day dreaming.

In addition, both meditation and yoga have been found to have impacts on the brain, specifically the caudate. Strengthening of the caudate has been shown in meditators as well as yogis. The increased connectedness of the caudate has potential to be responsible for the improved well-being that is associated with yoga and meditation.

Changes in the brain
Meditation is under preliminary research to assess possible changes in grey matter concentrations.

Attention/Mind wandering 
Non-directive forms of meditation where the meditator lets their mind wander freely can actually produce higher levels of activity in the default mode network when compared to a resting state or having the brain in a neutral place. These Non directive forms of meditation allows the meditators to have better control over thoughts during everyday activities or when focusing on specific task due to a reduced frustration at the brains mind wandering process. When given a specific task, meditation can allow quicker response to changing environmental stimuli. Meditation can allow the brain to decrease attention to unwanted responses of irrelevant environmental stimuli and a reduces the Stroop effect. Those who meditate have regularly demonstrated more control on what they focus their attention on while maintaining a mindful awareness on what is around them.  Experienced meditators have been shown to have an increased ability when it comes to conflict monitoring and find it easier to switch between competing stimuli. Those who practice meditation experience an increase of attentional resources in the brain and steady meditation practice can lead to the reduction of the attentional blink due to a decreased mental exertion when identifying important stimuli.

Perception
Studies have shown that meditation has both short-term and long-term effects on various perceptual faculties. In 1984 a study showed that meditators have a significantly lower detection threshold for light stimuli of short duration. In 2000 a study of the perception of visual illusions by zen masters, novice meditators, and non-meditators showed statistically significant effects found for the Poggendorff Illusion but not for the Müller-Lyer Illusion. The zen masters experienced a statistically significant reduction in initial illusion (measured as error in millimeters) and a lower decrement in illusion for subsequent trials. Tloczynski has described the theory of mechanism behind the changes in perception that accompany mindfulness meditation thus: "A person who meditates consequently perceives objects more as directly experienced stimuli and less as concepts… With the removal or minimization of cognitive stimuli and generally increasing awareness, meditation can therefore influence both the quality (accuracy) and quantity (detection) of perception." Brown points to this as a possible explanation of the phenomenon: "[the higher rate of detection of single light flashes] involves quieting some of the higher mental processes which normally obstruct the perception of subtle events." In other words, the practice may temporarily or permanently alter some of the top-down processing involved in filtering subtle events usually deemed noise by the perceptual filters.

Memory 
Meditation enhances memory capacity specifically in the working memory and increases executive functioning by helping participants better understand what is happening moment for moment. Those who meditate regularly have demonstrated the ability to better process and distinguish important information from the working memory and store it into long-term memory with more accuracy than those who do not practice meditation techniques. Meditation may be able to expand the amount of information that can be held within working memory and by so doing is able to improve IQ scores and increase individual intelligence. The encoding process for both audio and visual information has been shown to be more accurate and detailed when meditation is used. Though there are limited studies on meditation's effects on long-term memory, because of meditations ability to increase attentional awareness, episodic long-term memory is believed to be more vivid and accurate for those who meditate regularly. Meditation has also shown to decrease memory complaints from those with Alzheimer's disease which also suggests the benefits meditation could have on episodic long-term memory which is linked to Alzheimer's.

Calming and relaxation
According to an article in Psychological Bulletin, EEG activity slows as a result of meditation. Some types of meditation may lead to a calming effect by reducing sympathetic nervous system activity while increasing parasympathetic nervous system activity. Or, equivalently, that meditation produces a reduction in arousal and increase in relaxation.

Herbert Benson, founder of the Mind-Body Medical Institute, which is affiliated with Harvard University and several Boston hospitals, reports that meditation induces a host of biochemical and physical changes in the body collectively referred to as the "relaxation response". The relaxation response includes changes in metabolism, heart rate, respiration, blood pressure and brain chemistry. Benson and his team have also done clinical studies at Buddhist monasteries in the Himalayan Mountains. Benson wrote The Relaxation Response to document the benefits of meditation, which in 1975 were not yet widely known.

Aging
There is no good evidence to indicate that meditation affects the brain in aging.

Happiness and emotional well-being

Studies have shown meditators to have higher happiness than control groups, although this may be due to non-specific factors such as meditators having better general self-care.

Positive relationships have been found between the volume of gray matter in the right precuneus area of the brain and both meditation and the subject's subjective happiness score. A recent study found that participants who engaged in a body-scan meditation for about 20 minutes self-reported higher levels of happiness and decrease in anxiety compared to participants who just rested during the 20-minute time span. These results suggest that an increase in awareness of one's body through meditation causes a state of selflessness and a feeling of connectedness. This result then leads to reports of positive emotions.

A technique known as mindfulness-based stress reduction (MBSR) displays significant benefits for mental health and coping behaviors. Participants who had no prior experience with MBSR reported a significant increase in happiness after eight weeks of MBSR practice. Focus on the present moment and increased awareness of one's thoughts can help monitor and reduce judgment or negative thoughts, causing a report of higher emotional well-being. The MBSR program and evidence for its effectiveness is described in Jon Kabat-Zinn's book Full Catastrophe Living.

Pain

Meditation has been show to reduce pain perception. An intervention known as mindfulness-based pain management (MBPM) has been subject to a range of studies demonstrating its effectiveness.

Potential adverse effects and limits of meditation

The understanding of the potential for adverse effects in meditation is evolving. In 2014, the US government-run National Center for Complementary and Integrative Health suggested that:
Meditation is considered to be safe for healthy people. There have been rare reports that meditation could cause or worsen symptoms in people who have certain psychiatric problems, but this question has not been fully researched.
A 2022 update of the same webpage is more cautionary:
A 2020 review examined 83 studies (a total of 6,703 participants) and found that 55 of those studies reported negative experiences related to meditation practices. The researchers concluded that about 8 percent of participants had a negative effect from practicing meditation, which is similar to the percentage reported for psychological therapies.
Another 2021 review found negative impacts in 37% of the sampled participants in mindfulness-based programmes, with lasting bad effects in 6–14% of the sample, associated with hyperarousal and dissociation.

More broadly, the potential for adverse effects from meditation is well-documented both in scientific articles and the popular press. Cases of suicide, self-harm, and significant disturbance among meditation practitioners are also documented in canonical and other historical sources.  Organisations such as Cheetah House and Meditating in Safety document research on problems arising in meditation, and offer help for meditators in distress or those recovering from meditation-related health problems.  In some cases, adverse effects may be attributed to "improper use of meditation" or the aggravation of a preexisting condition; however, developing research in this area suggests the need for deeper engagement with the causes of severe distress, which previous "meditation teachers have perhaps too quickly and rather insensitively dismissed as pre-existing or unrelated psychopathology". Where meditation is prescribed or offered as a treatment,
Principles of informed consent require that treatment choice be based in part on the balance of benefits to harms, and therefore can only be made if harms are adequately measured and known.

As with any practice, meditation may also be used to avoid facing ongoing problems or emerging crises in the meditator's life. In such situations, it may instead be helpful to apply mindful attitudes while actively engaging with current problems. According to the NIH, meditation should not be used as a replacement for conventional health care or as a reason to postpone seeing a doctor.

Difficulties in the scientific study of meditation

Weaknesses in historic meditation and mindfulness research

In June 2007, the United States National Center for Complementary and Integrative Health (NCCIH) published an independent, peer-reviewed, meta-analysis of the state of meditation research, conducted by researchers at the University of Alberta Evidence-based Practice Center. The report reviewed 813 studies involving five broad categories of meditation: mantra meditation, mindfulness meditation, yoga, T'ai chi, and Qigong, and included all studies on adults through September 2005, with a particular focus on research pertaining to hypertension, cardiovascular disease, and substance abuse. The report concluded:

It noted that there is no theoretical explanation of health effects from meditation common to all meditation techniques.

A version of this report subsequently published in the Journal of Alternative and Complementary Medicine in 2008 stated: "Most clinical trials on meditation practices are generally characterized by poor methodological quality with significant threats to validity in every major quality domain assessed." This was despite a statistically significant increase in quality of all reviewed meditation research, in general, over time between 1956 and 2005. Of the 400 clinical studies, 10% were found to be good quality. A call was made for rigorous study of meditation. These authors also noted that this finding is not unique to the area of meditation research and that the quality of reporting is a frequent problem in other areas of complementary and alternative medicine (CAM) research and related therapy research domains.

Of more than 3,000 scientific studies that were found in a comprehensive search of 17 relevant databases, only about 4% had randomised controlled trials (RCTs), which are designed to exclude the placebo effect.

In a 2013 meta-analysis, Awasthi argued that meditation is defined poorly and despite the research studies showing clinical efficacy, exact mechanisms of action remain unclear. 
A 2017 commentary was similarly mixed, with concerns including the particular characteristics of individuals who tend to participate in mindfulness and meditation research.

Position statements

A 2013 statement from the American Heart Association (AHA) evaluated the evidence for the effectiveness of TM as a treatment for hypertension as "unknown/unclear/uncertain or not well-established", and stated: "Because of many negative studies or mixed results and a paucity of available trials... other meditation techniques are not recommended in clinical practice to lower BP at this time." According to the AHA, while there are promising results about the impact of meditation in reducing blood pressure and managing insomnia, depression and anxiety, it is not a replacement for healthy lifestyle changes and is not a substitute for effective medication.

Methodological obstacles

The term meditation encompasses a wide range of practices and interventions rooted in different traditions, but research literature has sometimes failed to adequately specify the nature of the particular meditation practice(s) being studied. Different forms of meditation practice may yield different results depending on the factors being studied.

The presence of a number of intertwined factors including the effects of meditation, the theoretical orientation of how meditation practices are taught, the cultural background of meditators, and generic group effects complicates the task of isolating the effects of meditation:

See also 
 Buddhism and psychology
 Neuroplasticity

References

External links 
 

Alternative medicine
Meditation
Mindfulness (psychology)